Charles Hatley (born January 26, 1986) is an American professional boxer.

Amateur career
Hatley had a record of 250-12 during his amateur career. He also won the 2007 U.S. National Amateur welterweight championship and was a 2008 Olympic alternate.

Professional career
In May 2009, Charles knocked out Puerto Rico's Carlos Garcia in the first round. On September 29, 2010 he won an eight round unanimous decision over the veteran Emanuel Augustus.

Hatley won the WBC Silver junior middleweight world title belt in 2015 from Anthony Mundine. He subsequently lost his WBC Silver belt in his first defence in 2017.

References

External links

Sportspeople from Dallas
Welterweight boxers
1986 births
Living people
Boxers from Texas
African-American boxers
American male boxers
21st-century African-American sportspeople
20th-century African-American people